IV is the fourth studio album from reggae band The Aggrolites.  It is the band's third album for Hellcat Records.

Prior to the album's release, the band posted "The Sufferer" on their Myspace page.  "It's Gonna Be OK" was also included on the ANTI- Sampler 2009 which was posted on Amazon.com for free download.

Track listing
All tracks are credited to Jesse Wagner, Jeff Roffredo, Brian Dixon and Roger Rivas.
 "Firecracker" - 4:31
 "What A Complex" - 3:59
 "Wild Time" - 3:02
 "Feelin' Alright" - 4:00
 "The Sufferer" - 3:09
 "It's Time To Go" - 3:58
 "By Her Side" - 3:32
 "Brother Jacob" - 3:55
 "Musically On Top" - 3:14
 "Reggae Summertime" - 4:11
 "Ever Want To Try" - 3:09
 "Keep Moving On" - 4:00
 "Tear That Falls" - 3:09
 "Gotta Find Someone Better" - 4:00
 "Lick It Up" - 4:12
 "The Least I Could Do" - 2:52
 "Runnin' Strong" - 2:41
 "Precious and Few" - 3:46
 "Tonight" - 3:04
 "Soul Gathering" - 2:35
 "It's Gonna Be OK" - 4:06

Personnel
 Jesse Wagner: Lead Vocals / Guitar / Backup Vocals
 Roger Rivas: Piano / Organ / Group Vocals
 Brian Dixon: Guitar / Group Vocals
 Jeff Rofredo: Bass / Backup Vocals

Additional musicians
 Scott Abels: Drums, Percussion
 Korey "Kingston" Horn: Drums on "Feelin' Alright", "By Her Side", "The Least I Could Do", "Runnin' Strong"
 Efren Santana: Saxophone
 Tom Cook: Trombone
 Todd Simon: Trumpet

Other credits
 Recorded at Kingsize Soundlabs in Eagle Rock, California
 All songs written, recorded, mixed, and produced by Dixon/Rivas/Rofredo/Wagner (BMI)
 Mastered by Gene Grimaldi at Oasis in Burbank, CA
 2nd Engineer: Richard P. Robinson
 Artwork by Roger Rivas and Tom D. Kline
 Photography by Jiro Schneider

References

The Aggrolites albums
2009 albums
Albums recorded at Kingsize Soundlabs